The 1936–37 season was the 64th season of competitive football in Scotland and the 47th season of the Scottish Football League.

Scottish League Division One 

Champions: Rangers
Relegated: Dunfermline Athletic, Albion Rovers

Scottish League Division Two 

Promoted: Ayr United, Greenock Morton

Scottish Cup 

Celtic were winners of the Scottish Cup after a 2–1 final win over Aberdeen.

Other Honours

National

County 

 * – aggregate over two legs
 # – replay

Highland League

Junior Cup 
Arthurlie were winners of the Junior Cup after a 5–1 win over Kirkintilloch Rob Roy in the final.

Scotland national team 

Key:
 (H) = Home match
 (A) = Away match
 BHC = British Home Championship

Notes and references

External links 
 Scottish Football Historical Archive

 
Seasons in Scottish football